Langlade is an unincorporated community located in the town of Wolf River in Langlade County, Wisconsin, United States. It is located at the intersection of Wisconsin Highway 55 and Wisconsin Highway 64. The Langlade post office was established in June 1873 by its first postmaster, Charles H. Lazelere. The community is named for Charles Michel de Langlade, who established a trading post in the 1740s.

References

Unincorporated communities in Langlade County, Wisconsin
Unincorporated communities in Wisconsin